"Cry, Cry, Cry" is a song written by John Scott Sherrill and Don Devaney, and recorded by American country music group Highway 101. It was released in January 1988 as the fourth single from the album Highway 101. The song was Highway 101's second number-one single on the country chart. The single went to number one on the Hot Country Singles chart, holding the position for one week. In Canada, the song went to number one on the RPM country singles chart.

Music video
The music video was directed by Claude Borenzweig and premiered in early 1988.

Charts

Weekly charts

Year-end charts

References

1988 singles
1987 songs
Highway 101 songs
Songs written by John Scott Sherrill
Song recordings produced by Paul Worley
Warner Records singles